Mapleton may refer to:

Places

Australia
 Mapleton, Queensland

Canada
 Mapleton, New Brunswick, a rural community in Kings County
 Mapleton, Moncton, New Brunswick, a neighborhood
 Mapleton, Nova Scotia
 Mapleton, Ontario

England
 Mapleton, Derbyshire

United States
 Mapleton, Illinois
 Mapleton, Iowa
 Mapleton, Kansas
 Mapleton, Maine, a New England town
 Mapleton (CDP), Maine, the main village in the town
 Mapleton, Michigan
 Mapleton, Minnesota
 Mapleton, New York, hamlet in Niagara County
 Mapleton, Brooklyn, New York, a neighborhood
 Mapleton (White Plains, New York), a house listed on the National Register of Historic Places
 Mapleton, Oregon
 Mapleton, Pennsylvania
 Mapleton, North Dakota
 Mapleton, Utah
 Mapleton, Wisconsin

Companies
 Mapleton Communications